Balasubramanian Muthuraman (born 26 September 1944) was the Vice Chairman of Tata Steel, India's largest steel manufacturer and chairman Tata International.

He has been awarded the Padma Bhushan by the Indian government in 2012. He studied metallurgical engineering at IIT Madras, followed by M.B.A. from XLRI Jamshedpur, and started his career at Tata Steel in 1966.  He is also an alumnus of the GMP (General Management Program) at CEDEP, the European Center for Executive Development, where Tata Steel has been a Corporate Member since 1991.

He is also the former Chairman of the Board of Governors of XLRI- Xavier School of Management (XLRI), Jamshedpur and National Institute of Technology, Jamshedpur (N. I. T.). Mr. B Muthuraman,  was also nominated as the Chairman of the Board of Governors of IIT Kharagpur by the Honourable President of India, Mrs. Pratibha Patil. He is currently the Chairman of Board of Governors of UVCE. He is also currently the Chairman of XIME, Chennai. 

He retired at the age of 70, as per norms laid out by the Tata Group.

Early life and career
Balasubramanian Muthuraman joined Tata Steel as a trainee in 1966. He was later shifted to the marketing and sales division after he had gained experience in the fields of iron-making and engineering development after 10 years. He worked for 20 years in this position before being appointed  the vice president of the company.

References 

Businesspeople from Mumbai
INSEAD alumni
IIT Madras alumni
Tata Steel people
Recipients of the Padma Bhushan in trade and industry
Tata Group people
1944 births
Living people
XLRI – Xavier School of Management alumni